Mathilde de Morny (26 May 1863 – 29 June 1944) was a French aristocrat and artist. Morny was also known by the nickname "Missy" or by the artistic pseudonym "Yssim" (an anagram of Missy), or as "Max", "Uncle Max", or "Monsieur le Marquis". Active as a sculptor and painter, Morny studied under Comte Saint-Cène and the sculptor Édouard-Gustave-Louis Millet de Marcilly.

Early life
Morny was the fourth and final child of Charles de Morny, Duke of Morny and Sofia Sergeyevna Trubetskaya. Charles was the half-brother of Napoleon III, whilst Sofia may have been the illegitimate daughter of Nicholas I of Russia. As a teenager, Morny had adhered to sartorial convention. An 1882 magazine article describes the newlywed marquise as wearing "a dress of the very palest mauve, mixed tulle and silk," adding that Morny "is not exactly pretty, but has a most original face, being very pale, with a very set expression, the darkest eyes possible, and quantities of very fair hair."

Career
Although female, the adult Morny dressed in men's clothing, and used the name "Max". Morny was a socialite and painter.

Extravagant conduct made Morny a celebrity of the Belle Époque and despite their 1881 marriage to the well-known gay man Jacques Godart, 6th Marquis de Belbeuf (1850–1906)—whom Morny divorced in 1903—Morny was open about preferring women. Though love between those perceived as women was then fashionable, Morny was attacked for this, especially for having a very masculine dress and attitude. At this time a woman wearing trousers could still scandalize even if the person was legally authorized, as in the case of lesbian artist Rosa Bonheur (who sought police permission to wear trousers to make it easier for her to paint in the countryside). Missy wore a full three-piece suit (which, as with trousers, was forbidden in France for anyone but men), had short hair, and smoked a cigar.

Morny became a lover of several women in Paris, including Liane de Pougy and Colette. From summer 1906 onwards, Colette and Morny lived together in the "Belle Plage" villa in Le Crotoy, where Colette wrote Les Vrilles de la vigne and La Vagabonde which would be adapted for the screen by Musidora. On 3 January 1907 the two put on a pantomime entitled Rêve d'Égypte ("Dream of Egypt") at the Moulin Rouge, in which Morny caused a scandal by playing an Egyptologist during a love scene with a woman – a kiss between them almost caused a riot and the production was stopped by the prefect of police Louis Lépine. From then on they could no longer live together openly, though the relationship lasted until 1912. Morny also inspired the character "La Chevalière" in Colette's novel Le Pur et l'impur, described as dressed "in dark masculine attire, belying any notion of gaiety or bravado... High born, she slummed it like a prince."

On 21 June 1910 the couple bought the manor of "Rozven" at Saint-Coulomb in Brittany (its owner, Baron du Crest, refused the sale because Mathilde was not dressed as a woman and so Colette signed the deed instead) – on the same day the first chamber of the tribunal de grande instance for the Seine departement pronounced Colette's divorce from Henry Gauthier-Villars. When they separated a year later, Colette kept the house.

Death
At the end of May 1944 Morny attempted to commit suicide by what Colette described as "something like harakiri". Morny died by self-asphyxiation with a gas stove on 29 June 1944, aged 81.

In popular culture 
De Morny is a major character in the 2018 film Colette, played by Denise Gough.

References

Bibliography 

 Fernande Gontier et Claude Francis, Mathilde de Morny. La Scandaleuse Marquise et son temps, Perrin, 2005.
 Fernande Gontier, Homme ou femme ? La confusion des sexes, chapter 8, Paris, Perrin, 2006.
 Colette, Lettres à Missy. Edited and annotated by Samia Bordji and Frédéric Maget, Paris, Flammarion, 2009.
 Olga Khoroshilova,  Russian travesties: in history, culture and everyday life (in Russian), chapter 11 "Russian Uncle Max (Mathilde de Morny)", Moscow, MIF, 2021. - P. 235–255.

1863 births
1944 suicides
19th-century French sculptors
19th-century French women
20th-century French sculptors
20th-century French women
19th-century French LGBT people
Colette
Female-to-male cross-dressers
French marchionesses
Nobility from Paris
19th-century French painters
French people of Russian descent
French socialites
Lesbian sculptors
Lesbian painters
French lesbian artists
French lesbian actresses
French LGBT painters
French LGBT sculptors
Artists from Paris
Suicides by gas
1944 deaths
20th-century French painters
20th-century French LGBT people
Suicides in France